Phalonidia ontariana is a species of moth of the family Tortricidae. It is found in North America, where it has been recorded from Ontario, Minnesota and Wisconsin.

Adults have been recorded on wing in June.

References

Moths described in 1997
Phalonidia